Manzanilla or manzanilla (Spanish for "little apple" literally) may refer to:

Plants and their products
 Manzanilla (wine), a variety of fino sherry
 , a Spanish wine region
 Manzanilla, Spanish term for "chamomile" (any variety) or the plant's flowers, or chamomile tea
 Manzanilla, a common name for Malvaviscus arboreus (wax mallow, Turk's cap) and its fruit
 Manzanilla de la muerte (Spanish: "little apple of death"), manchineel in English (Hippomane mancinella), a tree with apple-like but poisonous fruit
 Manzanilla olive (Olea europaea), a common variety of Spanish olive cultivar

Geography
 Manzanilla, Spain, municipality in Huelva province, Spain
 Manzanilla, Trinidad and Tobago, town in east coastal Trinidad, with surrounding North Manzanilla, Upper Manzanilla, Lower Manzanilla and Manzanilla Beach
 La Manzanilla, a town in Jalisco, Mexico
 La Manzanilla de La Paz, a town and municipality in Jalisco, Mexico

See also
 Manzanillo (disambiguation)